Leticia Adelaide Appiah is a Ghanaian physician and a Senior Public Health Specialist, She is the executive director of the National Population Council (NPC).
She attended Achimota Senior High.

References

Living people
Year of birth missing (living people)